Alpha-1,3-mannosyl-glycoprotein 2-beta-N-acetylglucosaminyltransferase (N-acetylglucosaminyltransferase I, N-glycosyl-oligosaccharide-glycoprotein N-acetylglucosaminyltransferase I, uridine diphosphoacetylglucosamine-alpha-1,3-mannosylglycoprotein beta-1,2-N-acetylglucosaminyltransferase, UDP-N-acetylglucosaminyl:alpha-1,3-D-mannoside-beta-1,2-N-acetylglucosaminyltransferase I, UDP-N-acetylglucosaminyl:alpha-3-D-mannoside beta-1,2-N-acetylglucosaminyltransferase I, alpha-1,3-mannosyl-glycoprotein beta-1,2-N-acetylglucosaminyltransferase, GnTI) is an enzyme with systematic name UDP-N-acetyl-D-glucosamine:3-(alpha-D-mannosyl)-beta-D-mannosyl-glycoprotein 2-beta-N-acetyl-D-glucosaminyltransferase. This enzyme catalyses the following chemical reaction

 UDP-N-acetyl-D-glucosamine + 3-(alpha-D-mannosyl)-beta-D-mannosyl-R  UDP + 3-(2-[N-acetyl-beta-D-glucosaminyl]-alpha-D-mannosyl)-beta-D-mannosyl-R

R represents the remainder of the N-linked oligosaccharide in the glycoprotein acceptor.

References

External links 
 

EC 2.4.1